The 1925 Penn State Nittany Lions football team was an American football team that represented Pennsylvania State College as an independent during the 1925 college football season. In its eighth season under head coach Hugo Bezdek, the team compiled a 4–4–1 record and outscored opponents by a total of 67 to 66. The team played its home games at New Beaver Field in State College, Pennsylvania.

Schedule

References

Penn State
Penn State Nittany Lions football seasons
Penn State Nittany Lions football